The 2019–20 season is Vitosha Bistritsa's third consecutive season in the Bulgarian First League after they won 3-0 the play-off promotion/relegation match against Montana on May 3, 2019, on Slavia Stadium in Sofia with goals of Grigor Dolapchiev and Emil Gargorov (2).

Squad

Fixtures

Regular season

Bulgarian Cup

Squad statistics

|-
|colspan="10"|Players who left Vitosha Bistritsa during the season:

|}

References 

 
 Vitosha - Montana 3:0 (in Bulgarian). sportal.bg

Vitosha
FC Vitosha Bistritsa seasons